Pla d'Urgell is a comarca (county) in the interior of Catalonia, Spain.

Municipalities

References

External links
 Official comarcal web site (in Catalan)

 
Comarques of the Province of Lleida